Dundee West was a constituency of the Scottish Parliament (Holyrood). It elected one Member of the Scottish Parliament (MSP) by the first past the post method of election. Also, however, it is one of nine constituencies in the North East Scotland electoral region, which elects seven additional members, in addition to nine constituency MSPs, to produce a form of proportional representation for the region as a whole.

From the Scottish Parliament election, 2011, Dundee West was redrawn and renamed Dundee City West

Electoral region

The other eight constituencies of the North East Scotland region include: Aberdeen Central, Aberdeen North, Aberdeen South, Angus, Banff and Buchan, Dundee East, Gordon  and West Aberdeenshire and Kincardine

The region covers the Aberdeenshire council area, the Aberdeen City council area, the Dundee City council area, part of the Angus council area, a small part of the Moray council area and a small part of the Perth and Kinross council area.

Constituency boundaries
The Dundee West constituency was created at the same time as the Scottish Parliament, in 1999, with the name and boundaries of an existing Westminster constituency. In 2005, however, the boundaries of the Westminster (House of Commons) constituency were subject to some alteration.

Renamed Dundee City West for the 2011 elections, the electoral wards used in the newly shaped constituency are:

 In full: Strathmartine, Lochee, West End
 In part: Coldside, Maryfield, North East

Council area
The Holyrood constituency was within the Dundee City council area, which was divided between three North East Scotland constituencies. Dundee West and Dundee East are within the city area.
The Angus constituency covered north-eastern and north-western areas of the city, as well as a southern portion of the Angus council area and a small eastern portion of the Perth and Kinross council area.

Member of the Scottish Parliament

Election results
These results are for Dundee West. For candidates and results from 2011, see Dundee City West

See also
 Politics of Dundee

Scottish Parliament constituencies and regions 1999–2011
Politics of Dundee
1999 establishments in Scotland
Constituencies established in 1999
2011 disestablishments in Scotland
Constituencies disestablished in 2011